The 2019 Australian Formula 3 Championship was an Australian open-wheel racing series for FIA Formula 3 cars constructed and conforming to the regulations before and including 2011. The series began on 10 March 2019 at Winton Motor Raceway and concluded on 3 November 2019 at Queensland Raceway. Organized by Formula Three Management Pty Ltd, it was the 21st consecutive year of Australian Formula 3.

The championship was won by John Magro, winner of all the races.

Teams and drivers
The following teams and drivers contested the 2019 Australian Formula 3 Championship. All teams and drivers are Australian-registered.

Classes
Competing cars were nominated into one of three classes:
 Championship Class – for automobiles constructed in accordance with the FIA Formula 3 regulations that applied in the year of manufacture between 1 January 2005 and 31 December 2011.
 National Class – for automobiles constructed in accordance with the FIA Formula 3 regulations that applied in the year of manufacture between 1 January 2002 and 31 December 2007.
 Trophy Class.

Calendar & race results
The series was contested over six rounds. All rounds were held in Australia.

Standings
 Points system
Points for are awarded as follows:

Drivers' championship

References

Australian Formula 3 seasons
Formula 3
Australian
Australian F3